This is a list of public art in the London Borough of Hounslow.

Bedfont

Brentford

Chiswick

Feltham

Hanworth

Heston

Hounslow

Isleworth

Osterley

References

Bibliography

External links
 

Hounslow
Hounslow
Tourist attractions in the London Borough of Hounslow